Kent Estates is an unincorporated area and census-designated place (CDP) in Muscatine County, Iowa, United States. It is in the center of the county, along the northern border of Muscatine, the county seat. Iowa Highway 38 runs through the eastern part of the community, leading south  to the center of Muscatine and north  to Wilton.

Kent Estates was first listed as a CDP prior to the 2020 census.

Demographics

References 

Census-designated places in Muscatine County, Iowa
Census-designated places in Iowa